Micrura is a genus of nemerteans belonging to the family Lineidae.

The genus has almost cosmopolitan distribution.

Species

Species:

Micrura achrostocephala 
Micrura affinis 
Micrura akkeshiensis

References

Lineidae
Nemertea genera